Tozasertib (VX-680) is an aurora inhibitor.

Protein kinase inhibitors
Pyrimidines
Thioethers
Pyrazoles
Piperazines
Cyclopropanes